The President of the Lebanese Republic is the head of state of Lebanon. The president is elected by the parliament for a term of six years, which cannot be renewed immediately because they can only be renewed non-consecutively. By convention, the president is always a Maronite Christian who fulfills the same requirements as a candidate for the house of representatives, as per article 49 of the Lebanese constitution.

History

From the expiration of the term of President Michel Suleiman in May 2014 until October 31, 2016, the parliament was unable to obtain the majority required to elect a president, and the office was vacant for almost two and a half years, despite more than 30 votes being held. On October 31, 2016, the parliament finally elected Michel Aoun as president.

Office

Qualifications
The constitution requires the president hold the same qualifications as a member of Parliament (also called the Chamber of Deputies), which are Lebanese citizenship and attainment of the age of twenty-five years.

Though not specifically stated in the constitution, an understanding known as the National Pact, agreed in 1943, customarily limits the office to members of the Maronite Christian faith. This is based on a gentlemen's agreement between Lebanon's Maronite Christian president Bechara El Khoury and his Sunni Muslim prime minister Riad Al Solh, which was reached in 1943, when Lebanon became independent of France, and described that the president of the Republic was to be a Maronite Christian, the prime minister a Sunni Muslim, and the speaker of Parliament a Shia Muslim.

Article 50 of the constitution of Lebanon requires the president to take an oath upon assuming office, which is prescribed thus:

Role and responsibilities
As described in the constitution, the president is commander-in-chief of the Lebanese Armed Forces and security forces; may appoint and dismiss the prime minister and cabinet; promulgates laws passed by Parliament; may also veto bills; and may dissolve Parliament. In addition, he may also issue "emergency" legislation by decree. In practice, however, Lebanon being a parliamentary republic, the president is essentially the repository of reserve powers and the office is largely symbolic. Nevertheless, the president remains by and large the most important member of the executive.  This is despite his powers having been somewhat moderated under Ta'if, notably with the increase in the powers of the Cabinet; nevertheless, these reforms have not substantially altered the president's power, as he is still the sole person who can nominate and fire the prime minister and the Cabinet.

His major responsibilities (following Ta'if) include:

 Issue the decree appointing the prime minister (by convention Sunni Muslim) independently.
 Issue the decree forming the government (i.e. the cabinet), co-signed by the prime minister. The government must then receive a vote-of-confidence by parliament (51%) in order to become active.
 Fire the prime minister (at will, no confirmation needed).  This automatically fires the entire government, meaning every minister.
 Fire an individual minister.  Requires confirmation of 2/3 of the cabinet and the signature of the PM.  If more than 1/3 of the ministers constituting the initial government are fired/resign, then the entire government is considered resign.
 Sign into law and promulgate laws (countersigned by the PM).
 Sign decrees concerning a specific ministry(ies). Countersigned by the PM and ministers involved.
 Negotiate and ratify international treaties. All treaties must be approved by 2/3 of the cabinet and countersigned by the PM before entering into force. Treaties involving spending that cannot be cancelled every new year must also be approved by Parliament (51%).
 Dissolve the parliament. Must be countersigned by the PM and requires a 2/3 approval of the cabinet.
 Pass "emergency decrees" without the parliament's approval (article 58). Requires a simple majority of the ministers. To pass emergency decrees without the parliament's approval, the parliament must spend 40 days without taking any action on a bill that was previously declared urgent by the president.

Previously to Ta'if, the president only needed the "favourable advice" of his ministers, rather than a clear consensus/majority. Nevertheless, while it may seem that the president is a "symbolic role" or significantly subjected to the will of his ministers, constitutionally, it is not so. The president retains the right to fire the entire government at will and is still the person who nominates every minister - thereby effectively ensuring that they will all be favorable to him. In practice, the president's office has been weakened because of a) no clear majorities of parties and blocs in Parliament, b) the election of "consensus" (meaning generally weak, or different), presidents, and c) the formation of divided cabinets. The perceived weakness of the president is thus rooted in political, rather than constitutional, issues.

Symbolic roles and duties 
Following the ratification of the Ta'if Accord, the Constitution laid out a preamble for the three "key" executive posts: the president, the prime minister, and the Council of Ministers. The preamble states the following:

The posts that come with the presidency are as follow:

 Chair of the Supreme Defense Council.
 Commander in chief of the armed forces.
 State President of Lebanon (the head of state).

The presidential residence is the Baabda Palace, located southeast of Beirut.

Official state car
The president's car is a W221 Mercedes-Benz S 600 Guard armoured limousine and it is escorted by the Republican Guard's SUVs and other security vehicles including the preceding official state car, an armoured W140 S 600 now possibly used as a backup limo.

Election and Vacancy
Thirty to sixty days before the expiration of a president's term, the speaker of the Chamber of Deputies calls for a special session to elect a new president, which selects a candidate for a six-year term on a secret ballot in which a two-thirds majority is required to elect. If no candidate receives a two-thirds majority, a second ballot is held in which only a majority is required to elect. An individual cannot be reelected president until six years have passed from the expiration of his or her first term.

Quorum for an election
The Constitution is silent on the issue of the quorum needed to call to order a parliamentary presidential electoral meeting. In the absence of a clear provision designating the quorum needed to elect the president, the constitution is open to differing interpretations. According to one view on the issue, a quorum constituting a majority of fifty-percent plus one (that required for any meeting of Parliament) is sufficient for a parliamentary presidential electoral meeting. Another view on the issue argues that the quorum is a two-thirds majority of the total members of Parliament as Article 49 of the constitution requires a two-thirds voting majority to elect the president in the first round and, if the quorum were half plus one, there would have been no need to require the two-thirds voting majority when the number of deputies present at the meeting does not exceed the quorum.

Vacancy
A recurrent theme in Lebanese politics is the vacancy in the Lebanese presidency which has occurred for three consecutive times; no Lebanese president has directly transferred power to a successor without vacancy since Elias Hrawi was succeeded by Emile Lahoud in 1998. Unlike several other countries, the Lebanese constitution does not notice an "interim/acting" president. The constitution specifically states that the post of the presidency remains vacant, and some powers of the presidency get transferred to the council of ministers. Article 62 in the Lebanese constitution specifically states this: "Should there be a vacancy in the Presidency for any reason whatsoever, the Council of Ministers shall exercise the authorities of the President by delegation." After Michel Aoun left the presidency in 2022 to vacancy, then prime minister Najib Mikati said that he did not personally assume the powers of the presidency, as they will be delegated to the council of ministers as a whole.

See also

 Prime Minister of Lebanon
 Legislative speaker of Lebanon

References

 
Politics of Lebanon
1943 establishments in Lebanon